Neco Shay Williams (born 13 April 2001) is a Welsh professional footballer who plays as a full-back for Premier League club Nottingham Forest and the Wales national team.

Club career

Liverpool

Williams joined the academy of Liverpool at the age of six and progressed through the youth ranks, representing the club at U18, U19 and U23 level, as well as in the UEFA Youth League. He suffered a serious back injury which ruled him out for most of the 2017–18 season, but recovered his place to feature in the club's victorious FA Youth Cup campaign two years later. 

Williams' form at youth level was rewarded when, on 30 October 2019, he made his debut for the senior side, starting in a 5–5 (5–4) penalty shoot-out win over Arsenal in the EFL Cup. He featured prominently in the match and recorded a last-minute assist for Divock Origi's goal to send the match to penalties, where Liverpool emerged victorious. In December, he was included in Liverpool's squad which won the 2019 FIFA Club World Cup, although he was an unused substitute in both of the club's matches in the competition. 

Following the turn of the year, he starred in a team largely made up of teenagers and reserves that defeated Merseyside rivals Everton in the FA Cup 3rd round, and Shrewsbury Town in the 4th round replay, forcing an own goal from Ro-Shaun Williams in the latter fixture to secure his side's progression in the competition. In the match against Shrewsbury, Williams was also part of a starting line-up that was the youngest in Liverpool's history, with an average age of 19 years and two days. His Premier League debut followed on 24 June 2020, shortly after campaign resumed following a three-month long suspension caused by the COVID-19 outbreak, when he featured as a 74th-minute substitute in a 4–0 win over Crystal Palace. Williams would go on to make enough appearances to secure his league winners' medal, and a few weeks later on 17 August, he signed a new long-term deal with the Reds.

On 31 January 2022, Williams joined Championship club Fulham on loan until the end of the 2021–22 season. He scored the first senior club goals of his career when he scored twice in a 5–1 win over Swansea City on 8 March 2022.

Nottingham Forest
Williams signed for newly promoted Premier League club Nottingham Forest on 10 July 2022 on a four-year contract for a fee reported to be around £17 million.

International career
Williams was born in Wrexham and has represented Wales at Under 19 level. In August 2020 he was called into the senior Wales squad for the first time.  Williams made his Wales debut in a 1–0 UEFA Nations League win over Finland on 3 September 2020. He scored his first goal for the senior team on 6 September 2020 against Bulgaria in the UEFA Nations League, scoring the winning goal in a 1–0 victory for Wales. In May 2021 he was selected for the Wales squad for the delayed UEFA Euro 2020 tournament.

Williams helped Wales qualify for the FIFA World Cup in 2022 for the first time since 1958. In November 2022 he was named in the Wales squad for the 2022 FIFA World Cup in Qatar.

Personal life
Williams has a younger brother, Keelan Williams, who plays for Burnley's Under 18 side.

Williams' grandfather, Kelvin Jones, died in November 2022, the day before Williams started in Wales' opening game of the World Cup; he revealed the loss after game, dedicating his performance to Jones.

Career statistics

Club

International

Wales' score listed first, score column indicates score after each Williams goal

Honours
Liverpool Youth
FA Youth Cup: 2018–19

Liverpool
Premier League: 2019–20
FIFA Club World Cup: 2019

Fulham
EFL Championship: 2021–22

References

External links

Profile at the Nottingham Forest F.C. website

2001 births
Living people
Footballers from Wrexham
Welsh footballers
Association football defenders
Liverpool F.C. players
Fulham F.C. players
Nottingham Forest F.C. players
Premier League players
English Football League players
Wales youth international footballers
Wales international footballers
UEFA Euro 2020 players
2022 FIFA World Cup players